Countrytime is a Canadian agricultural news and information television program which aired on CBC Television from 1960 to 1966.

Premise
This current affairs program was produced as separate regional versions in Halifax, Toronto, Winnipeg, and Vancouver. The first half of each episode featured 15 minutes of national agricultural news, then the remainder of the program contained regional news and information. For example, Ontario and Quebec viewers saw Earl Cox with a gardening segment, while Atlantic Canadians saw Gordon Warren on their broadcasts.

This program is distinct from CBC's Countrytime country music television program which was produced during the 1970s.

Scheduling
This half-hour program was broadcast from 1960 to 1966.

External links
 
 

CBC Television original programming
1960 Canadian television series debuts
1966 Canadian television series endings